Augustin Cranach (1554 — 26 July 1595) was a German painter. He was born and died in Wittenberg, and was the son of Lucas Cranach the Younger and Magdalena Schurff.  He was the father of Lucas Cranach III.

See also
 List of German painters

References 
 Werner Schade: Die Malerfamilie Cranach. VEB Verlag der Kunst, Dresden 1974

External links 
 

16th-century German painters
German male painters
Cranach family
1554 births
1595 deaths